Michael C. Brewer (born April 13, 1969) is a Canadian former professional ice hockey defenseman, forward and coach who was an All-American for Brown.

Early life
Brewer was born in Chisholm, Ontario. After high school Brewer joined the Brown Bears men's ice hockey team. The 1989 Bears won one game out of 26 in their first season under Bob Gaudet. Brewer finished tied for second in scoring as a freshman with just 13 points. The team recovered the following year, including Brewer more than doubling his point production. He was named first-team all-conference for leading the teams's turnaround. Brewer missed six games the following season while studying abroad but was named an alternate captain despite missing time. He had his best output as a senior, again leading the team in scoring and pushing the Bears up to fifth in ECAC Hockey. While the team did not advance past the conference quarterfinals, Brewer was instrumental in Brown's turnaround and was named an All-American for his final season.

Career 
Brewer played for Team Canada for a season and then began his professional career in Europe. He saw moderate success with several teams in multiple countries but ended up retiring as a player in 1998. A decade later, while working as the head coach for Serbian junior teams, Brewer played 18 games for HK Vojvodina, his last appearance as a player.

Brewer was inducted into the Brown Athletic Hall of Fame in 1999.

Personal life
Mike's father was Carl Brewer, an NHL defenseman who won three Stanley Cups with the Toronto Maple Leafs.

Statistics

Regular season and playoffs

Awards and honors

References

External links

1969 births
Living people
Ice hockey people from Ontario
Canadian ice hockey defencemen
Canadian ice hockey forwards
Brown Bears men's ice hockey players
AHCA Division I men's ice hockey All-Americans
HC Vita Hästen players
HC Alleghe players
Washington Capitals draft picks
National Hockey League supplemental draft picks